"The Lakes" (stylized in all lowercase) is a song by American singer-songwriter Taylor Swift, taken from the deluxe edition of her eighth studio album, Folklore (2020). Written and produced by Swift and Jack Antonoff, "The Lakes" is a midtempo indie ballad, set to acoustic guitar and strings, with themes of introspection and escapism that reflect on Swift's semi-retirement in Windermere, the largest natural lake in England.

An orchestral version of "The Lakes", which is the original demo, was released as a promotional single by Republic Records on July 24, 2021, to commemorate the first anniversary of Folklore. 7-inch singles of "The Lakes" were exclusively sold in independent record shops on April 23, 2022, as part of the 2022 Record Store Day limited-edition vinyl releases.

Upon release, "The Lakes" received universal acclaim from music critics, with compliments on its sophisticated, poetic lyrics, and melancholic instrumentals; many named it a highlight on Folklore and one of the best songs of Swift's discography. The song debuted in the top 10 of the Canadian Digital Song Sales and US Digital Song Sales charts, and reached number 21 in Scotland and the UK Singles Downloads Chart, and number 27 in Hungary.

Release and background 

On July 23, 2020, American singer-songwriter Taylor Swift announced, via her social media accounts, that her eighth studio album, Folklore, would come out at midnight that same day, and revealed its track listing, where the lone bonus track on the deluxe edition, was titled "The Lakes". All tracks of Folklore were conceived by Swift as imageries and visuals, a result of her imagination "running wild" while isolating herself during the COVID-19 pandemic.

Initially exclusive to the deluxe editions of Folklore, which were issued on August 7, 2020, "The Lakes" was made available on digital and streaming platforms on August 18, 2020, along with a lyric video published to Swift's YouTube channel. The producer of "The Lakes", Jack Antonoff, said the song was a "big orchestral version" before Swift told him to make it smaller. This version was released to all music platforms on July 24, 2021, the first anniversary of Folklore. It is a few seconds longer than the album version of "The Lakes"; Swift tweeted: "It's been 1 year since we escaped the real world together and imagined ourselves someplace simpler. With tall trees & salt air. Where you can wear lace nightgowns that make you look like a Victorian ghost & no one will side eye you cause no one is around. To say thank you for all you have done to make this album what it was, I wanted to give you the original version of "The Lakes". Happy 1 year anniversary to Rebekah, Betty, Inez, James, Augustine and the stories we all created around them. Happy Anniversary, Folklore."

On April 23, 2022, for the Record Store Day, limited-edition vinyl records of songs by various artists were exclusively sold in independent record shops; it included 7-inch copies of "The Lakes", containing both the album version (on the A-side) and the original demo (B-side).

Composition 

"The Lakes" is a melodramatic, midtempo indie ballad driven by acoustic guitar, with lush orchestration heavily laden with strings and a "euphoric" crescendo of violins. Swift's vocal range in the song spans between D3 to F4. The song is written in the key of D major and has a moderate tempo of 90 beats per minute.

The poetic lyrics see Swift introspecting on her semi-retirement in Windermere, the largest lake in England, located in its Lake District. Swift fantasizes about a red rose growing out of tundra "with no one around to tweet it", indicating her idea of a utopia free of social media, feuds and urban settings, getting away from the society, her critics and detractors, and finding solace with her lover in the wilderness, like the Lake Poets. The songwriting exudes a depressive tone coupled with escapism, with references to Wisteria, a genus of aquatic flowering plants, and William Wordsworth, the 19th-century English poet who is recognized for his Romantic works. Aaron Dessner, Swift's collaborator on Folklore, stated the song uses hints of tragic Greek poetry, and feels like getting "lost in a beautiful garden". Mainstream media has surmised the song's subject, whom Swift refers to as "muse" and "beloved", to be her boyfriend and British actor Joe Alwyn. The lyric "I've come too far to watch some namedropping sleaze" is interpreted as a subtle hint at her publicized disputes with Kanye West and Scooter Braun.

Critical reception 
The song received universal critical acclaim. NME critic Hannah Mylrea opined that "The Lakes" is more poetic and romantic than any song on the standard edition of Folklore, and praised the song as "allusive". Rolling Stone's Brittany Spanos wrote that the song channels Romantic-era poetry, by depicting unconditional love "within a controversial life and painful experiences". In agreement, Wren Graves, writing for Consequence of Sound, also found the song to be Romantic, inspired by "one of the great periods in English literature". Sammy Andrews of Redbrick stated that the song demonstrates "exceptional" lyrical sophistication and maturity, attesting to Swift's "talent and craftsmanship as a songwriter". Tom Breihan, writing for Stereogum, called it a "soft, small-scale" love song about avoiding the public eye and "finding escape in some secluded enclave".

Billboard writer Gil Kaufman found "The Lakes" delightful, and complimented the sparse instrumentals, while Josiah Hughes of Exclaim! commended its "lush and elaborately produced" indie sound. Sarah Carson, reviewing for i, lauded Swift's "smart" wordplay and "dazzlingly novel" vocals, which she described as "soft, distinct, imperfect, and never so assured". Idolator Mike Wass labelled it a "dreamy anthem". Complimenting Swift's vulnerability and honesty, Sputnikmusic praised "The Lakes" as "an ideal product of its time", naming it one of the best songs Swift has ever written, and asserted it as the perfect closing track to Folklore. Gary Dinges of USA Today deemed the song a "serenade", mimicking a bittersweet version of Swift's 2017 song "Call It What You Want". Also comparing to "Call It What You Want", Glamour commentator Emily Tannenbaum defined the song as a melancholic love letter, and highlighted its macabre.

Commercial performance 
After three days of tracking, the song debuted at number five on the Billboard Digital Song Sales chart, and at number 18 on Billboard Bubbling Under the Hot 100 chart. It also reached the top-20 on New Zealand Top 40 Singles and Canadian Digital Song Sales charts, and the top-30 on Hungarian Singles, Scottish Singles and the UK Singles Downloads Chart charts.

Following its vinyl release in April 2022, "The Lakes" debuted at number 88 in the United Kingdom, and number 52 in Ireland.

Track listing
Digital download / streaming – Original version
 "The Lakes" (Original) – 3:47

7-inch vinyl
 "The Lakes" (Album version) – 3:31
 "The Lakes" (Original version) – 3:47

Credits and personnel
Credits adapted from the album's liner notes.

 Taylor Swift – vocals, songwriter, producer
 Jack Antonoff – producer, songwriter, recording engineer, live drums, live percussion, drum programming, electric guitar, keyboards, piano, background vocals
 Evan Smith – saxophone, clarinet, flute, keyboards, bass
 Bobby Hawk – strings
 Mike Williams – recording engineer
 John Gautier – recording engineer
 Jonathan Low – mixing engineer
 Laura Sisk – vocal engineer
 Randy Merrill – mastering engineer

Charts

Release history

Footnotes

References

2020s ballads
2020 songs
Taylor Swift songs
Song recordings produced by Jack Antonoff
Song recordings produced by Taylor Swift
Songs about England
Songs written by Jack Antonoff
Songs written by Taylor Swift
Songs about nature